Broadway Brevities are two-reel (17–21 minutes long) musical and dramatic film shorts produced by Warner Bros. between 1931 and 1943. The series continued as Warner Specials in later years.

Overview

Other titles used for these black and white two-reel films included “Vitaphone Musicals”, “Broadway Headliners”, “Presentation Revue” (for a couple 1938 releases) and “Blue Ribbon Comedy” for a trio featuring Elsa Maxwell. Usually the trade periodicals grouped them as “Broadway Brevities” for easier marketing purposes.

Many of these glossy productions, a few winning Academy Awards, featured dance spectaculars and mini-dramas with top Broadway theatre or Warner studio stars; famous names included Russ Columbo, Ruth Etting, Hal Le Roy, Bob Hope and Red Skelton. They were filmed at the Vitaphone studio in Brooklyn, New York until 1939, with Samuel Sax as a key producer. Production then moved to Burbank, California.

By the forties, an increasing number were of the documentary genre and the title “Broadway Brevity” was officially dropped in mid-1943 in favor of “Warner Special”. In 1948-1956, many were re-released to theaters under the heading “Classics of the Screen”.

List of titles

A full list is provided below by year of release (but not necessarily the same year filmed). Title is listed first, followed by the major credits and a release date. Sometimes a date reviewed by Film Daily or a copyright date  is listed instead.

1931

1932

1933

1934

1935

1936

1937

1938

1939

1940

1941

1942

1943

Warner Specials (1943-1951)

See also
List of short subjects by Hollywood studio#Warner Brothers
Robert Youngson, who supervised more “Classics of the Screen” two-reelers in the 1950s
Technicolor Specials (Warner Bros. series)

References
 
 
 Motion Pictures 1912-1939 Catalog of Copyright Entries 1951 Library of Congress 
 Motion Pictures 1940-1949 Catalog of Copyright Entries 1953 Library of Congress 
 Motion Pictures 1950-1959 Catalog of Copyright Entries 1960 Library of Congress 
BoxOffice back issue scans available (release date information in multiple issue “Shorts Charts”)

Notes

External links
 Film Daily links
Vitaphone short films